"Trying" is a song written by Billy Vaughn and performed by The Hilltoppers.  It reached number 5 on the Cashbox chart and number 7 on the U.S. Billboard pop chart in 1952.

The single ranked number 29 on Billboard's year-end top 30 singles of 1952.

Other charting versions
Ella Fitzgerald, number 22 on the U.S. pop chart in 1952.
The Hilltoppers, number 30 on the UK Singles Chart in 1956.
Vaughn, instrumental version, number 77 on the U.S. pop chart in 1958.

Other versions
Grady Martin and His Slew Foot Five, single in 1952.
Todd Rhodes Orchestra, single in 1952.
Timi Yuro, 1961 album Hurt!!!!!!!
LaVern Baker, 1963 album See See Rider.
The Four Lads, 1963 album Oh, Happy Day.
Bobby Vinton, 1964 album There! I've Said It Again.
Bob Gutman featuring The Ink Spots and Whistling Joe, single in 1968.
Rosco Gordon, 1998 compilation album Bootin' (The Best of RPM Years).
Texas Tornados, 2001 live album The Complete Live at the Limo Sessions!

References

1952 songs
1952 singles
1956 singles
1958 singles
1968 singles
Ella Fitzgerald songs
LaVern Baker songs
The Four Lads songs
Bobby Vinton songs
The Ink Spots songs
Dot Records singles
Decca Records singles
King Records (United States) singles